The 2013 Vietnam Open Grand Prix is the eighteenth and the last grand prix gold and grand prix tournament of the 2013 BWF Grand Prix Gold and Grand Prix. The tournament is held in Phan Dinh Phung Stadium, Ho Chi Minh City, Vietnam December 2–8, 2013 and has a total purse of $50,000.

Men's singles

Seeds

  Alamsyah Yunus (semi-final)
  Tan Chun Seang (final)
  Chan Yan Kit (third round)
  Zulfadli Zulkiffli (second round)
  Ashton Chen Yong Zhao (third round)
  Shon Wan-ho (champion)
  Wei Nan (quarter-final)
  Xue Song (quarter-final)
  Simon Santoso (semi-final)
  Ng Ka Long (first round)
  Loh Wei Sheng (withdrew)
  Park Sung-min (first round)
  Wang Tzu-wei (withdrew)
  Andre Marteen (first round)
  Evert Sukamta (first round)
  Hsueh Hsuan-yi (second round)

Finals

Top half

Section 1

Section 2

Section 3

Section 4

Bottom half

Section 5

Section 6

Section 7

Section 8

Women's singles

Seeds

  Febby Angguni (first round)
  Hera Desi (final)
  Maria Febe Kusumastuti (semi-final)
  Milicent Wiranto (first round)
  Salakjit Ponsana (first round)
  Pornpawee Chochuwong (quarter-final)
  Hsu Ya-ching (quarter-final)
  Kim Hyo-min (first round)

Finals

Top half

Section 1

Section 2

Bottom half

Section 3

Section 4

Men's doubles

Seeds

  Hendra Aprida Gunawan / Yonathan Suryatama (withdrew)
  Gan Teik Chai / Ong Soon Hock (withdrew)
  Evgenij Dremin / Sergey Lunev (second round)
  Hardianto / Agripinna Prima Rahmanto Putra (withdrew)
  Fran Kurniawan / Bona Septano (champion)
  Selvanus Geh / Alfian Eko Prasetya (withdrew)
  Hafiz Faisal / Putra Eka Rhoma (withdrew)
  Ketlen Kittinupong / Dechapol Puavaranukroh (second round)

Finals

Top half

Section 1

Section 2

Bottom half

Section 3

Section 4

Women's doubles

Seeds

  Ko A-ra / Yoo Hae-won (champion)
  Amelia Alicia Anscelly / Soong Fie Cho (final)
  Chen Hsiao-huan / Lai Chia-wen (semi-final)
  Chiang Kai-hsin / Tsai Pei-ling (first round)

Finals

Top half

Section 1

Section 2

Bottom half

Section 3

Section 4

Mixed doubles

Seeds

  Lukhi Apri Nugroho / Annisa Saufika (withdrew)
  Edi Subaktiar / Gloria Emanuelle Widjaja (withdrew)
  Liao Min-chun / Chen Hsiao-huan (final)
  Lin Chia-yu / Wang Pei-rong (quarter-final)
  Kim Dae-eun / Ko A-ra (second round)
  Kang Ji-wook / Choi Hye-in (semi-final)
  Alfian Eko Prasetya / Shendy Puspa Irawati (withdrew)
  Wong Fai Yin / Chow Mei Kuan (semi-final)

Finals

Top half

Section 1

Section 2

Bottom half

Section 3

Section 4

References

Vietnam Open (badminton)
2013 in Vietnamese sport
Vietnam Open Grand Prix